Unclay is an allegorical novel written by English writer T. F. Powys, first published in 1931. This was the last novel published during Powys' life.

Background
The word "un­clay" that gave the title to Powys's novel comes from a poem by Jeremy Taylor, the 17th century Anglican divine and author of The Rule and Exercises of Holy Dying (1651), which was an influence.

Plot
Death arrives to the obscure village of Little Dodder, Dorsetshire carrying a parchment of orders he must deliver with the names of two local mortals and the word "unclay" on it. After losing this important document, he's obliged to stay in Little Dodder until he finds it. Mr. John Death, as the villagers call him, grows interested in human life and decides to take a vacation from his reaping. All the old sins such as lust, avarice, and greed, as well as loving kindness abound in the village.

Critical reception
Kirkus Reviews magazine defined the narrative voice as "satirical but generally gentle, even bumpkin-esque, and sometimes precious" and said it recalled Swift, Twain, Austen, and Jerome K. Jerome, as well as managing to "masterfully cover the spectrum of human failings, from petty to vile, with insight and humor." The Washington Post praised it by saying it was "[Powys's] masterpiece". Argentine writer Jorge Luis Borges described the book as "Heretical, scandalous, and mocking, but essentially parables."

References

1931 novels
1931 British novels
Novels set in Dorset
English novels
Chatto & Windus books
Christian novels
English fantasy novels